Skewer may refer to:
Skewer, a thin metal or wood stick used to hold small pieces of food together
Skewer (chess), a chess tactic
Quick release skewer, a mechanism for attaching a wheel to a bicycle
The Skewer, BBC radio comedy programme

See also
Skua (disambiguation)